Tobias Felix Schättin (born 5 June 1997) is a Swiss footballer who plays as a leftback for Winterthur.

Club career
Schättin spent his whole junior career at the FC Winterthur youth academy, and made 44 appearances for the first team. On 12 March 2018, Schättin signed with FC Zürich in the Swiss Super League, on loan from Winterthur with an option to buy. He made his professional debut for Zurich in a Swiss Super League 1–1 tie with FC Sion on 31 March 2018. He returned to Winterthur for the following seasons. On 26 August 2020 he signed a two year contract with FC Zürich.

On 24 June 2021, he returned to Winterthur.

International career
Schättin is a former youth international for Switzerland, having represented them at all youth levels.

References

External links
 Soccerway Profile
 SFL Profile
 FCZ Profile
 Switzerland U15 Profile
 Switzerland U16 Profile
 Switzerland U17 Profile
 Switzerland U19 Profile
 Switzerland U20 Profile
 Switzerland U21 Profile

1997 births
Living people
Footballers from Zürich
Swiss men's footballers
Switzerland youth international footballers
Switzerland under-21 international footballers
FC Zürich players
FC Winterthur players
Swiss Super League players
Swiss Challenge League players
Association football defenders